Walter Segal (15 May 1907 – 27 October 1985) was an architect who developed a system of self-build housing, the 
Segal self-build method. Based on traditional timber frame methods modified to use standard modern materials, his method eliminates the need for wet trades such as bricklaying and plastering, resulting in a light-weight method which can be built with minimal experience and is ecologically sound. The roofs tend to be flat with many layers of roofing felt, which allows the creation of grass-covered roofs. Foundations are minimal, often just paving slabs, the strength coming from the geometry of their construction. Segal houses have been compared to traditional Japanese houses.

Early life
Segal was born in 1907 in Berlin, Germany, and grew up in Ascona, Switzerland, as the son of the Romanian Jewish painter Arthur Segal and artist Ernestine Chavas. They spent the time of the First World War in Ascona close to an alternative community called Monte Verità (McKean: 1988). Walter Segal studied architecture among the pioneers of the Modern Movement in Berlin and Delft, Netherlands, and received his first commission in 1932 from a patron of his father, Bernhard Mayer, to build a small wooden holiday cabin in Ascona. This was followed by further commissions in Ascona and later in Majorca. In 1934-5 he worked in Egypt studying and illustrating dynastic chairs and stools, primarily those from the tomb of Tutankhamun.

He moved to London, UK in 1936 where he met and eventually married Eva Bradt, a student at the Architectural Association School of Architecture. He taught at the school, wrote in trade journals, published a couple of books and had a few small architectural commissions. He worked on commissions for furniture and interior design and during the war he designed air raid shelters and hotels for the Ministry of Supply.

He lived in Highgate, London, and their son, John, was born in 1948. By then Segal had built his first main building, which was a block of flats in south London. Eva died in 1950.

The little house in the garden
In 1963 Segal married Moran Scott, who also lived in Highgate. To gain more living space, they eventually demolished and rebuilt Scott's house. They built a temporary structure in the garden using standard cladding materials and with no foundations other than paving slabs. It took two weeks to build and cost £800. This house, dubbed the "Little House in the Garden", roused considerable interest and led to a number of commissions using a similar style around the country. As the system developed the clients were able to do more and more of the building themselves.

In the 1970s Lewisham Borough Council made three small sites, unsuitable for mainstream housing, available for people to build their own homes using the method. Due to the success of these a fourth site was later made available.

Legacy
After his death in 1985 the Walter Segal Self Build Trust was set up, and his methods have gained in popularity. A Segal house at the Centre for Alternative Technology has helped in spreading the system. At least six of these buildings and schemes have won awards, ranging from the prestigious Housing Project Design Award to Green Building of the Year. The dry-trade construction used in Segal method houses allowed such a building in London, constructed in 1988 and by 2012 scheduled for demolition, to be dismantled and re-erected on a new site.

References

Bibliography
Walter Segal, Home and Environment, Leonard Hill (1948, 1953)
Walter Segal, Planning and Transport: Their Effects on Industry and Residence Dent, for the Cooperative Permanent Building Society, (1945)
Walter Segal, Learning from the Self-Builders (Audiobook), World Microfilms Publications Ltd (December 1983)
John McKean, 'The Segal System', special issue on systems, Architectural Design, March 1976, pp. 288–96.
John McKean 'Semi prezio di buon senso’ ('Not just liberation through technology, but implicit meanings too: an appreciation of Walter Segal') in Spazio e Societa (Milano), June 1986, No. 34, pp. 18–26.	
John McKean 'Walter Segal: the man and the myth', extended essay in Building Design (London), 10 May 1988
John McKean, Learning from Segal: Walter Segal's Life, Work and Influence, Birkhauser (Basel and Boston) (1989) [contains full bibliographies]
John McKean, 'Becoming an Architect in Europe Between the Wars', Architectural History (The Journal of the Society of Architectural Historians of G. B.), Vol. XXXIX, 1996, pp. 124 – 146. (the story of Segal's education)
Marion Eaton-Krauss, Walter Segal, 'The Thrones, Chairs, Stools, and Footstools from the Tomb of Tutankhamun', Griffith Institute (Oxford), 2008.

External links
Walter Segal Self-build Trust
Celebration of Walter Segal buildings
WALTER SEGAL - Community Architect article by Colin Ward on knowing Segal
Grand Designs profile of a Walter Segal-inspired self-built community, with retrospective 12 years after completion

20th-century Romanian architects
1907 births
1985 deaths
Jewish architects
Romanian Jews
German emigrants to the United Kingdom